KHVM-LD channel 48 is a digital low-power television station in Minneapolis, Minnesota. Its main affiliation is with the Global Christian Network. It broadcasts with a 15 kW signal from its Arden Hills, Minnesota tower, which it shares with sister station KTCJ-LD channel 50, a Cornerstone Television Network affiliate, and Daystar Television Network affiliate WDMI-LD channel 62.  The station's tower was hit by lightning around Memorial Day 2010, forcing both stations KHVM-LD and KTCJ-LD to go silent (WDMI converted from analog to digital about the same time).

KHVM previously broadcast a highly directional signal on channel 28 that carried southwest, to possibly to avoid signal conflicts with PBS Wisconsin station WHWC-TV channel 28 in Menomonie, Wisconsin. KHVM gained an FCC "Special Temporary Authority" (STA) to broadcast at 0.35 kW power. In addition, KAWB in Brainerd, Minnesota, which also broadcasts on channel 28, displaced KHVM. KHVM began broadcasting on channel 48 over the last weekend in July 2011 following a construction permit to move to the channel. The station has been off air since August, 2017.

References

External links 
 CTVN official site
 EICB website
 RabbitEars.info website
 tvfool.com

Low-power television stations in the United States
Television stations in Minneapolis–Saint Paul
Television channels and stations established in 1990
1990 establishments in Minnesota